Stanley Harold Brown (15 March 1907 – 15 June 1978) was an English cricketer active in the late 1930s. Born at Arlesey, Bedfordshire, Brown was a right-handed batsman.

Brown two appearances in first-class cricket for the Marylebone Cricket Club at Lord's. He made one appearance in 1930 against Wales and a second appearance against Kent in 1933, scoring a total of 26 runs. He later played minor counties cricket for Wiltshire in the 1937 and 1938 Minor Counties Championship, making seven appearances.

He died at Hitchin, Hertfordshire on 15 June 1978.

References

External links
Stanley Brown at ESPNcricinfo
Stanley Brown at CricketArchive

1907 births
1978 deaths
People from Arlesey
English cricketers
Marylebone Cricket Club cricketers
Wiltshire cricketers